Ohio Valley Career and Technical Center is a public high school located outside of West Union, Ohio, United States.  It is one of four high schools in the Adams County/Ohio Valley School District, the other being North Adams, Peebles, and West Union High Schools. The student population is made up from three schools previously listed, along with students from Manchester High School.

The OVCTC has the following programs:
Administrative Office Technology/Business Professionals,
Agricultural Mechanics,
Automotive Technology,
Carpentry,
Cosmetology,
Farm Business Management,
Health Career and Technology,
Information Systems Technology,
Machine Shop,
Masonry,
Restaurant Management

The OVCTC also has classes for mathematics, science, language arts, government, and personal finance. Starting in the academic year 2011–2012, the OVCTC will also offer elective courses for students to take. These elective courses include Literature in Film, Creative Writing, Current Events, Study Skills/OGT Prep, and more.

The OVCTC also has a yearbook that features students from all four Adams County high schools.

External links
 District Website
 School Website

High schools in Adams County, Ohio
Public high schools in Ohio